Ruvim or Rufim (Руфим), is a Christian name found in South and East Slavic cultures. It may refer to:

Rufim Njeguš, Orthodox Metropolitan of Cetinje (1594–1636)
Rufim Boljević, Orthodox Metropolitan of Cetinje (1662–73)
Hadži-Ruvim (1752–1804), Orthodox archimandrite
Ruvim Frayerman (1891–1972), Soviet writer

Serbian masculine given names